Intercity bus services in Germany virtually did not exist until 2013, when the market was liberalised with the end of Deutsche Bahn's monopoly on long-distance passenger travel. Liberalisation led to the creation of a number of coach companies, including Flixbus (founded in 2011). Many of the initial companies failed or sold their business to Flixbus, including  in 2017.

References 

Second Merkel cabinet